The lifted condensation level or lifting condensation level (LCL) is formally defined as the height at which the relative humidity (RH) of an air parcel will reach 100% with respect to liquid water when it is cooled by dry adiabatic lifting. The RH of air increases when it is cooled, since the amount of water vapor in the air (i.e., its specific humidity) remains constant, while the saturation vapor pressure decreases almost exponentially with decreasing temperature. If the air parcel is lifting further beyond the LCL, water vapor in the air parcel will begin condensing, forming cloud droplets. (In the real atmosphere, it is usually necessary for air to be slightly supersaturated, normally by around 0.5%, before condensation occurs; this translates into about 10 meters or so of additional lifting above the LCL.)  The LCL is a good approximation of the height of the cloud base which will be observed on days when air is lifted mechanically from the surface to the cloud base (e.g., due to convergence of airmasses).

Determining the LCL 
The LCL can be either computed or determined graphically using standard thermodynamic diagrams such as the skew-T log-P diagram or the tephigram.  Nearly all of these formulations make use of the relationship between the LCL and the dew point, which is the temperature to which an air parcel needs to be cooled isobarically until its RH just reaches 100%.  The LCL and dew point are similar, with one key difference: to find the LCL, an air parcel's pressure is decreased while it is lifted, causing it to expand, which in turn causes it to cool.  To determine the dew point, in contrast, the pressure is kept constant, and the air parcel is cooled by bringing it into contact with a colder body (this is like the condensation you see on the outside of a glass full of a cold drink).  Below the LCL, the dew point temperature is less than the actual ("dry bulb") temperature.  As an air parcel is lifted, its pressure and temperature decrease. Its dew point temperature also decreases when the pressure is decreased, but not as quickly as its temperature decreases, so that if the pressure is decreased far enough, eventually the air parcel's temperature will be equal to the dew point temperature at that pressure.  This point is the LCL; this is graphically depicted in the diagram.

Using this background, the LCL can be found on a standard thermodynamic diagram as follows:

 Start at the initial temperature (T) and pressure of the air parcel and follow the dry adiabatic lapse rate line upward (provided that the RH in the air parcel is less than 100%, otherwise it is already at or above LCL).
 From the initial dew point temperature (Td) of the parcel at its starting pressure, follow  the line for the constant equilibrium mixing ratio (or "saturation mixing ratio") upward.
 The intersection of these two lines is the LCL.

Exact expression for the LCL
Until recently, it was thought that there was no exact, analytic formula for the LCL. In 2015, Yin et al. developed an analytical expression for LCL height using Lambert-W function under the assumption of constant latent heat of vaporization. Separately, in 2017, David Romps derived the explicit and analytic expression for the LCL and the analogous lifting deposition level (LDL) assuming only constant heat capacities:

The function  is the  branch of the Lambert W function. Computer programs to calculate these LCL values in R, Python, Matlab, and Fortran 90 are available for download.

Defining the lifting deposition level (LDL) as the height at which the air parcel becomes saturated with respect to ice, the analogous expression for the LDL is:

Here,  is the initial relative humidity of the air parcel with respect to solid water (i.e., ice).

Approximate expressions for the LCL
There are also many different ways to approximate the LCL, to various degrees of accuracy. The most well known and widely used among these is Espy's equation, which James Espy formulated already in the early 19th century.  His equation makes use of the relationship between the LCL and dew point temperature discussed above.  In the Earth's atmosphere near the surface, the lapse rate for dry adiabatic lifting is about 9.8 K/km, and the lapse rate of the dew point is about 1.8 K/km (it varies from about 1.6-1.9 K/km).  This gives the slopes of the curves shown in the diagram.  The altitude where they intersect can be computed as the ratio between the difference in the initial temperature and initial dew point temperature  to the difference in the slopes of the two curves.  Since the slopes are the two lapse rates, their difference is about 8 K/km.  Inverting this gives 0.125 km/K, or 125 m/K.  Recognizing this, Espy pointed out that the LCL can be approximated as:

This formula is accurate to within about 1% for the LCL height under normal atmospheric conditions, but requires knowing the dew-point temperature.

Relation with CCL 
The convective condensation level (CCL) results when strong surface heating causes buoyant lifting of surface air and subsequent mixing of the planetary boundary layer, so that the layer near the surface ends up with a dry adiabatic lapse rate.  As the mixing becomes deeper, it will get to the point where the LCL of an air parcel starting at the surface is at the top of the mixed region.  When this occurs, then any further solar heating of the surface will cause a cloud to form topping the well-mixed boundary layer, and the level at which this occurs is called the CCL.  If the boundary layer starts off with a stable temperature profile (that is, with a lapse rate less than the dry adiabatic lapse rate), then the CCL will be higher than the LCL.  In nature, the actual cloud base is often initially somewhere between the LCL and the CCL.  If a thunderstorm forms, then as it grows and matures, processes such as increased saturation at lower levels from precipitation and lower surface pressure usually lead to a lowering of the cloud base.

Finally, the LCL can also be considered in relation to the level of free convection (LFC). A smaller difference between the LCL and LFC (LCL-LFC) is conducive to the rapid formation of thunderstorms.  One reason for this is that a parcel requires less work and time to pass through the layer of convective inhibition (CIN) to reach its level of free convection (LFC), after which deep, moist convection ensues and air parcels buoyantly rise in the positive area of a sounding, accumulating convective available potential energy (CAPE) until reaching the equilibrium level (EL).

See also 
 Atmospheric convection
 Atmospheric thermodynamics

References

Related reading 
 Bohren, C.F., and B. Albrecht, Atmospheric Thermodynamics, Oxford University Press, 1998. 
 M K Yau and R.R. Rogers, Short Course in Cloud Physics, Third Edition, published by Butterworth-Heinemann, January 1, 1989, 304 pages.

External links 
 LCL tutorial
 SKEW-T: A LOOK AT SBLCL 
 Lifting condensation level (LCL) (Glossary of Meteorology)

Atmospheric thermodynamics
Severe weather and convection